The Special Court for War Criminals and Enemies of the People, usually referred only as The Special Court, was a Socialist court set up during the spring of 1945 (1 March - 13 April) in the newly established Socialist Albania, which carried on the trial against those labeled as "people's enemies" and "war criminals". It was based on a decision taken by the Anti-Fascist Council of National Liberation on 25 December 1944. Like the rest of the Eastern Europe, the purge against fascists and war criminals became a central part of the construction of society based on the Soviet model.

Background
In November 1944, the socialist partisans (LANÇ) took power and began immediately with the arrest of all public figures who were perceived to have collaborated with the occupiers or not to have supported the LANÇ before. The Bashkimi newspaper of the Democratic Front of Albania had already been coming out in early January 1945 with agitative editorials pointing to "traitors" and "people's enemies". Sixty of these public figures were the object a treason trial in March 1945 at a socialist Special Court with Prosecutor Koçi Xoxe. Xoxe, Minister of Interior, was considered from some as the most powerful person in Albania for the moment.

Proceedings
Various non-Socialist/non-Communists politicians were object of the court: Pro-Italians, Nazi collaborationists, Balli Kombetar members, previous Ministers, anti-Communist figures, military personnel, King Zog supporters, former publishers and journalists, and members of public administration during the Italian and German regime.
"People's Tribunals" had been taking place since December 1944, but the most notorious was the Special Court of Tirana. The Special Court started in Tirana on 1 March 1945, and lasted until April 13 1945. The sessions took place in the premises of former "Savoja" cinema (renamed later to "Kosova" cinema, today's Albanian National Theater building). During this time it held 31 session and trialed 60 persons. General Lieutenant Koçi Xoxe was the leading judge, while General Major Bedri Spahiu was the prosecutor. The jury had 9 members, others were Beqir Balluku, Medar Shtylla (Minister of Economy), Faik Shehu, Halim Budo, Gaqo Floqi, Hysni Kapo, Bilbil Klosi, Gjon Banushi.

The defendants were:

Most of the defendants were found guilty: 17 were executed by firing squad, 8 received life imprisonment, and the rest various prison terms. Abdurrahman Telqiu and Luigj Filaj were released due to lack of evidence. Ded Jakova, Zef Shiroka, and Abedin Xhiku were sentenced to 1, 2, and 1 year but were released on probation.

Aftermath
With the demise of Koçi Xoxe in 1949, few political figures, including the ones which would be arrested and sentenced later, would get partially rehabilitated. Other notorious trials would come out during the socialist period in Albania, i.e. the "Assembly Members' Group", the "Sabotators' Group", "Coup d'Etat Group" and many more. Xoxe, Beqir Balluku, Bedri Spahiu would be later accused themselves of "treason" and "enemy of the people" and executed or imprisoned.

See also
Show trial
Communism in Albania
Albanian resistance during World War II
Albania under Italy
Albania under Nazi Germany

References

Courts in Albania
Nazi war crimes in Albania
Trials in Albania
Communism in Albania
World War II war crimes trials
1945 in Albania
People's Socialist Republic of Albania
Courts and tribunals established in 1945